Martin Charles William Gorick (born 23 June 1962) is a British Anglican bishop, who has served since 2020 as Bishop of Dudley, the sole suffragan bishop in the Church of England Diocese of Worcester. He was previously Archdeacon of Oxford in the Diocese of Oxford from 2013.

Early life and education
Gorick was born on 23 June 1962 in Liverpool, England. From 1973 to 1980, he was educated at West Bridgford School, a comprehensive school in West Bridgford, Nottinghamshire. Gorick studied at Selwyn College, Cambridge, from 1981 to 1984, and trained for ordination at Ripon College Cuddesdon 1985 to 1987.

Ordained ministry
Gorick was ordained by David Jenkins, Bishop of Durham in 1987 in Durham Cathedral. He was Curate of Birtley, Tyne and Wear until 1991 when he was appointed Domestic Chaplain to Richard Harries, Bishop of Oxford. He was Vicar of Smethwick from 1994, and Area Dean of Warley; Vicar of the Church of the Holy Trinity, Stratford-upon-Avon from 2001 until his appointment as Archdeacon of Oxford and Canon Residentiary of Christ Church, Oxford in 2013. Gorick was also Diocesan Inter-Faith Adviser, leads on Church Planting and Fresh Expressions and oversees Chaplaincy in the Diocese of Oxford.

Episcopal ministry
On 4 November 2019, it was announced that Gorick would be the next Bishop of Dudley, the suffragan bishop in the Diocese of Worcester. On 28 January 2020, he was consecrated as a bishop by Justin Welby, Archbishop of Canterbury, during a service at Southwark Cathedral. Gorick will be welcomed into the diocese as the Bishop of Dudley in February 2020.

Views
In November 2022, he published a letter alongside his diocesan bishop, John Inge, that stated "the time has come for the Church to celebrate and honour same sex relations" and supported the introduction of same-sex marriage in the Church of England.

References

1962 births
People educated at West Bridgford School
Alumni of Selwyn College, Cambridge
Archdeacons of Oxford
Bishops of Dudley
Living people
Clergy from Liverpool
Alumni of Ripon College Cuddesdon